A rail land bridge is a route allowing the transport of containers by rail between ports on either side of a land mass, such as North America.  Jean-Paul Rodrigue defined a rail land bridge as having two characteristics:  First, a single bill of lading issued by the freight forwarder that covers the entire journey, and second, the freight remains in the same container for the total transit.  One example of a rail land bridge is the Eurasian Land Bridge.  A transcontinental railroad can be a type of land bridge.

References

Supply chain management
Economic integration
Transnationalism
Rail freight transport
International rail transport
Passenger rail transport